The Grand Canyon Rivalry (also known as the Grand Canyon Trophy Game) is an American college football rivalry between the Northern Arizona Lumberjacks and the Southern Utah Thunderbirds. The Grand Canyon Trophy is presented to the winner of the game. The Lumberjacks are the current holder of the trophy.

Series history
Between 1982 and 2011, Northern Arizona and Southern Utah played fifteen times as non-conference opponents. Since 1970, Northern Arizona had been members of the Big Sky Conference, playing at a Division 1 level. Southern Utah's division and conference affiliation fluctuated during this time. However, in 2011, the Big Sky conference expanded to 13 football playing members, and Southern Utah University was extended an all-sports invitation. Since then, the Lumberjacks and Thunderbirds have competed every year. In 2012, the Grand Canyon Trophy was introduced as a traveling trophy that would go to the winner. The trophy was first won by Southern Utah by a score of 35–29. In 2022, Southern Utah left the Big Sky Conference for the Western Athletic Conference. The two schools have scheduled a 12 game, home and home series for the 2028 through 2039 seasons

Game results

See also 
 List of NCAA college football rivalry games

References

College football rivalries in the United States
Southern Utah Thunderbirds football
Northern Arizona Lumberjacks football
Big Sky Conference rivalries